Martin Stanford Peters  (8 November 1943 – 21 December 2019) was an English footballer and manager. As a member of the England team which won the 1966 FIFA World Cup, he scored the second of England's four goals in the final against West Germany. He also played in the 1970 World Cup. Born in Plaistow, Essex, he played club football for West Ham United, Tottenham Hotspur, Norwich City and Sheffield United. He briefly managed Sheffield United before retiring from professional football in 1981.

Peters was known as "the complete midfielder" as he could pass the ball well with either foot, was good in the air and difficult to mark because of his movement. A free kick specialist, he was described by England manager Sir Alf Ramsey, after a game against Scotland in 1968, as being "ten years ahead of his time". His versatility was such that while he was at West Ham he played in every position in the team, including goalkeeper in his third game, replacing an injured Brian Rhodes. With his transfer from West Ham United to Tottenham Hotspur in 1970, he became Britain's first £200,000 footballer.

Early years
Peters was born in Egham Road, off Beckton Road in Plaistow, Essex, on Monday 8 November 1943 during the Second World War. His father, William Peters, was a Thames Lighterman. Shortly after Peters's birth he was evacuated with his mother to Shropshire to avoid the bombing of London by the Luftwaffe. When he was seven his family moved to Dagenham, where he attended the local Fanshawe School. In schoolboy football, he played mostly as a centre-half but often as a full-back. He came to the attention of Fulham, Arsenal, Tottenham Hotspur and Chelsea. Peters did not support any club as a schoolboy and favoured joining Chelsea as his friend Terry Venables, whom he had met playing for Dagenham Schoolboys, had signed for Chelsea. After playing for England schoolboys he was scouted by Wally St Pier for West Ham United. In the summer of 1959 he was signed as a 15-year-old apprentice by West Ham.

Club career

West Ham United
Peters signed his first professional contract in November 1960. His first manager Ted Fenton left the club in 1961, to be replaced by Ron Greenwood. He was a major influence on Peters and his progress as a young footballer. In his first years with West Ham, Peters had played in both defensive and midfield positions before Fenton had encouraged him to play as a right-half. He made his debut on Good Friday 1962 in a 4–1 home win against Cardiff City. He scored his first goal for West Ham in a 6–1 win at Manchester City on 8 September 1962. Also in 1962, Peters played in goal for West Ham in a game against Cardiff City after regular goalkeeper, Brian Rhodes had been injured.

Peters played only five games in his first season with West Ham. Although he played 32 league games in the 1963–64 season, he played no part in their FA Cup run and was not selected for the FA Cup final of 1964 at Wembley, in which they beat Preston North End 3–2. The following year, however, he established himself as a first team regular and was victorious at Wembley when West Ham won the European Cup Winners Cup with victory over 1860 Munich. He was usually partnered in midfield by Eddie Bovington and Ronnie Boyce.

Peters began to impose himself on West Ham's game, and another chance for silverware came in 1966 when West Ham reached the League Cup final. The occasion was still over two-legs with each of the finalists hosting a leg (though this changed to a one-off final at Wembley a year later), and Peters played in both matches. He scored in the second game but opponents West Bromwich Albion emerged as 5–3 winners on aggregate. The 1968–69 season saw Peters's only hat-trick for West Ham, in a 4–0 home defeat of West Bromwich Albion. That was also his most prolific season: 24 goals came for him from 48 games.

Tottenham Hotspur
Feeling he was in the shadows of Bobby Moore and Geoff Hurst, Peters sought a new challenge. In March 1970, West Ham received a record-breaking £200,000 (£150,000 cash) for Peters from Tottenham Hotspur and he moved to White Hart Lane, with Spurs and England striker Jimmy Greaves (valued at £50,000) going the other way. On 21 March 1970, Peters scored on his Spurs debut against Coventry City. He won his first domestic winners' medal in 1971 when Spurs beat Aston Villa 2–0 in the League Cup final. And his second European triumph when Spurs beat Wolverhampton Wanderers 3–2 on aggregate to win the 1972 UEFA Cup Final. At the time the only all-English European final until Manchester United beat Chelsea in the UEFA Champions League Final of 2008. When Alan Mullery left for Fulham in 1972, Bill Nicholson made Martin club captain. And in the 1973 Football League Cup Final Peters was the winning skipper as they defeated Norwich City 1–0. He completed one more full season with Spurs, who lost the 1974 UEFA Cup final to Feyenoord on aggregate. He then moved in March 1975 to Norwich City – managed by his former West Ham teammate John Bond – for a fee of £40,000. In total Peters played 260 times in all competitions, scoring 76 goals.

Norwich City
Peters, now aged 31, made his debut appearance for Norwich on 15 March 1975 in a 1–1 away draw with Manchester United. He helped newly promoted Norwich establish themselves in the First Division, making more than 200 appearances, and earning a testimonial against an all-star team which included most of the 1966 World Cup-winning England XI. He was voted Norwich City F.C. Player of the Season two years running, in 1976 and 1977, and in 2002 was made an inaugural member of the Norwich City F.C. Hall of Fame. In 1978, whilst still a Norwich City player, Peters was awarded an MBE for services to association football. Peters also travelled to Australia and played as a guest player for Victorian State League side Frankston City. For them he played five games, scoring three goals; the team won four and drew one of the matches in which he competed.

Sheffield United
He joined Sheffield United on 31 July 1980 as player-coach, eventually replacing Harry Haslam as manager.

International career

1966 World Cup
Alf Ramsey had seen Peters's potential quickly, and in May 1966 he gave the young midfielder his debut for England national team against Yugoslavia at Wembley. England won 2–0 and Peters had an outstanding debut. Nearly scoring twice he set up chances for Jimmy Greaves and for others. In the final preparation period for Ramsey prior to naming his squad for the World Cup, Peters played in two more of the scheduled warm-up games. Against Finland, he scored his first international goal in what was only his second appearance, and subsequently he made Ramsey's squad for the competition, as did his West Ham teammates Bobby Moore (the England captain) and Geoff Hurst.

Though Peters did not play in the opening group game against Uruguay, the drab 0–0 draw prompted Ramsey into changes. The England coach had been toying with using a system which allowed narrow play through the centre, not operating with conventional wingers but instead with fitter, centralised players who could show willing in defence as well as spread the ball and their runs in attack. Peters therefore had become an ideal player for this 4-1-3-2 system, elegant in his distribution and strong in his forward running, yet showing the stamina, discipline and pace to get back and help the defence when required. This system was dubbed "the wingless wonders".

Ramsey put Peters in the team for his fourth cap, for the second group game against Mexico, which England won 2–0. He kept his place as England got through their group, scraped past a violent Argentina side in the quarter finals (Peters's late cross set up Hurst's header for the only goal) and beat Portugal in the last four. The West Germany awaited in the final.

A tense but open game at Wembley saw the score at 1–1 in the final quarter of an hour when England won a corner. Alan Ball delivered it to the edge of the area to Hurst, who tried a shot on the turn. The ball deflected high into the air and bounced down into the penalty area where Peters rifled home a half-volley. West Germany equalised in the final seconds, though glory would still come the team's way with the 4–2 win in extra time, and Hurst – like Peters, winning only his eighth cap – completing a historic hat-trick.

1970 World Cup
Peters played in England's three group games in the 1970 World Cup finals in Mexico, from which they qualified, again with West Germany waiting in the last eight. Peters scored against Germany again early in the second half – a run and finish from behind a defender which no West German player had spotted – to establish a 2–0 lead, but later Ramsey committed a tactical error by substituting Peters and Bobby Charlton with Colin Bell and Norman Hunter, and West Germany won 3–2 in extra-time.

Other international fixtures
In 1972, Peters won his 50th England cap in a qualifier for the 1972 European Championships, beating Switzerland 3–2. England failed to progress due to another defeat against West Germany, who went on to win the tournament. International disappointment for Peters was tempered mildly by more club success, and he scored the only goal as England beat Scotland at Wembley on 19 May 1973. It was his 20th goal for his country and would prove to be his last. England had been stuttering in their qualifying campaign for the 1974 World Cup, dropping points in a drawn game against Wales and then a 2–0 defeat against Poland in Chorzów on 6 June 1973. England needed to defeat Poland at Wembley on 17 October 1973 to qualify for the finals in Germany, and with an out-of-form Moore dropped from the side – he would subsequently play only once more for his country – Peters captained the side for the crucial game. A defensive error allowed Poland to score, and only a penalty allowed England to level up quickly. Allan Clarke scored from it, but England could not get the crucial winning goal. Poland went through after the match finished 1–1, meaning Peters would not play in a third successive World Cup competition.

At the age of 30, Peters's career at the highest level began to slip away. He played three more games for England, reaching a total of 67 caps, though his career with his country ended on 18 May 1974, as England lost 2–0 against Scotland at Hampden Park.

Managerial career
His wait to become manager was not long, his final game coming against Gillingham on 17 January 1981 which Haslam was too ill to attend, and at which there were demonstrations from the Sheffield United fans. Peters retired to take up the manager's job the following day with United 12th in the table with 16 games to play, but was unable to halt the decline already in place, winning just three of the remaining games. For the first and only time in their history Sheffield United were relegated to the Fourth Division, and Peters resigned. On his retirement from professional football in January 1981, after a distinguished and injury-free career, he had made 882 appearances in total, scoring 220 goals. After he quit Sheffield United, Peters spent the 1982–83 season playing in defence for Gorleston in the Eastern Counties League.

After football

In 1984, he moved into the insurance business where he stayed until he was made redundant in July 2001.

Peters joined the board of directors at Spurs in a non-executive capacity in 1998, taking on a supporter-liaison role. He remained in that post for four years before stepping down, but remained one of the match-day welcomers in the hospitality suites at the club's White Hart Lane ground. He also worked in the hospitality suites at Upton Park for West Ham home matches.

In 2006, Peters published his autobiography, The Ghost of '66. That same year he was inducted, with former manager Ron Greenwood, into the English Football Hall of Fame in recognition of his achievements as a player.

Personal life

Peters identified as a Conservative Party supporter when asked about his politics in 1972.

In 2016, it was announced that Peters had Alzheimer's disease.
Peters died on 21 December 2019, aged 76. Tributes were paid to him from football clubs he played for, including West Ham, Tottenham Hotspur, Norwich City and many others. In September 2021, Peters’ ashes were interred in a foundation stone at West Ham's ground, the London Stadium.

Career statistics

Honours

Football
West Ham
European Cup-Winners' Cup: 1964–65
Football League Cup runner-up: 1965–66

Tottenham
League Cup: 1970–71, 1972–73
UEFA Cup: 1971–72; runner-up: 1973–74
Anglo-Italian League Cup: 1971

International
FIFA World Cup: 1966
UEFA European Football Championship third place: 1968

Orders and special awards

MBE for services to football, (1978).

References

Books

Internet

1943 births
2019 deaths
Footballers from Plaistow, Newham
English footballers
Association football midfielders
Association football utility players
West Ham United F.C. players
Tottenham Hotspur F.C. players
Norwich City F.C. players
Sheffield United F.C. players
Gorleston F.C. players
English Football League players
English Football League representative players
UEFA Cup winning players
English Football Hall of Fame inductees
Outfield association footballers who played in goal
England under-23 international footballers
England international footballers
1966 FIFA World Cup players
UEFA Euro 1968 players
1970 FIFA World Cup players
FIFA World Cup-winning players
English expatriate footballers
English expatriate sportspeople in Australia
Expatriate soccer players in Australia
English football managers
Association football player-managers
Sheffield United F.C. managers
English Football League managers
Members of the Order of the British Empire
Conservative Party (UK) people
People with Alzheimer's disease
Association football coaches
Footballers from Essex